The Church of San Juan de Berbío (Infiesto), in the Piloña council in Asturias, Spain, probably belonged to the monastery founded by Alfonso V in 1005; the Infanta Doña Urraca donated it to the Monastery of San Pedro de Eslonza in 1099.

The structure went through several redesigns in the fifteenth and sixteenth centuries. The most extensive was in the eighteenth century, which added square heads and porch trim. Of the original Romanesque design, all that remains are the basic building layout, the western facade double archivolt and bows and starts from the original facade. Until 1892, it was the parish church for Infiesto.

The church was destroyed by fire in 1936, during the Civil War, in which the eighteenth-century altarpiece was also burned.

Juan de Berbio
1005 establishments in Europe
11th-century Roman Catholic church buildings in Spain
Christian monasteries established in the 11th century
Romanesque architecture in Asturias
11th-century establishments in the Kingdom of León